A matriculation examination or matriculation exam is a university entrance examination, which is typically held towards the end of secondary school. After passing the examination, a student receives a school leaving certificate recognising academic qualifications from secondary-level education. Depending on scores or grades achieved, a student may then matriculate to university to take up further studies.

The following matriculation examinations are conducted:
 A-levels – in England, Wales, Northern Ireland and several Commonwealth countries
 Abitur – in Germany and Lithuania.
Iranian University Entrance Exam - in Iran 
 Bacalaureat – in Romania and Moldova.
 Baccalauréat – in France and many francophone countries.
 Eindexamen – in the Netherlands.
 Exit examination – in the United States.
 Regents Exam – New York State, USA
 Gaokao – in China.
 Higher – in Scotland.
 International Baccalaureate Diploma – International.
 ICFES exam – in Colombia
 Leaving Certificate – in Ireland.
 University of Dublin Matriculation Examination - for Trinity College Dublin
 Matric – in South Africa and formerly in Australia.
 Matura – in Albania, Austria, Bosnia and Herzegovina, Bulgaria, Croatia, Czech Republic, Hungary, Italy, Kosovo, Liechtenstein, Macedonia, Montenegro, Poland, Serbia, Slovakia, Slovenia, Switzerland and Ukraine.
 Prueba de Selección Universitaria – in Chile
 Student degree – in the Nordic countries.
 Studentereksamen, Danish student degree.
 Studentexamen, Swedish student degree (abolished).
 Generell Studiekompetanse, Norwegian student degree.
 Stúdentspróf, Icelandic student degree.
 Studentsprógv, Faroese student degree.
 Ylioppilastutkinto or Studentexamen, Finnish student degree.
 Bachillerato + Selectividad – in Spain.
 Bagrut – in Israel.
 Tawjihi – in Jordan and the Palestinian territories.
 Riigieksamid — in Estonia.
 Unified State Exam – in Russia.
 University Entrance Examination – in Myanmar (Burma)
 External independent testing - in Ukraine.
 Unified National Testing - in Kazakhstan.
 General Republican Testing - in Kyrgyzstan.
 Unified State/National Exams - in Armenia and Georgia 
 Centralized Testing - in Belarus and Tajikistan

See also
 List of secondary school leaving qualifications
 Diploma
 Final examination
 General Educational Development
 Matriculation

References

Qualifications